Ramón "Moncho" Hernández Cruz (born July 16, 1972) is a Puerto Rican volleyball coach and former beach volleyball player, who won the bronze medal in the men's beach team competition at the 2003 Pan American Games in Santo Domingo, Dominican Republic, partnering Raúl Papaleo. He represented his country at the 2004 Summer Olympics in Athens, Greece.

Hernandez played for the Nittany Lions from 1991 to 1994.

See also
List of Pennsylvania State University Olympians

References

External links
 
 

1972 births
Living people
Puerto Rican men's beach volleyball players
Beach volleyball players at the 2004 Summer Olympics
Olympic beach volleyball players of Puerto Rico
Beach volleyball players at the 2003 Pan American Games
Sportspeople from San Juan, Puerto Rico
Pan American Games bronze medalists for Puerto Rico
Pan American Games medalists in volleyball
Central American and Caribbean Games gold medalists for Puerto Rico
Competitors at the 2002 Central American and Caribbean Games
Central American and Caribbean Games medalists in beach volleyball
Pennsylvania State University alumni
Medalists at the 2003 Pan American Games
Penn State Nittany Lions men's volleyball players